In physics, extra dimensions are proposed additional space or time dimensions beyond the (3 + 1) typical of observed spacetime, such as the first attempts based on the Kaluza–Klein theory. Among theories proposing extra dimensions are:
 Large extra dimension, mostly motivated by the ADD model, by Nima Arkani-Hamed, Savas Dimopoulos, and Gia Dvali in 1998, in an attempt to solve the hierarchy problem. This theory requires that the fields of the Standard Model are confined to a four-dimensional membrane, while gravity propagates in several additional spatial dimensions that are large compared to the Planck scale.
 Warped extra dimensions, such as those proposed by the Randall–Sundrum model (RS), based on warped geometry where the universe is a five-dimensional anti-de Sitter space and the elementary particles except for the graviton are localized on a (3 + 1)-dimensional brane or branes.
 Universal extra dimension, proposed and first studied in 2000, assume, at variance with the ADD and RS approaches, that all fields propagate universally in extra dimensions.
 Multiple time dimensions, i.e. the possibility that there might be more than one dimension of time, has occasionally been discussed in physics and philosophy, although those models have to deal with the problem of causality.
 String theory has one notable feature that requires extra dimensions for mathematical consistency. Spacetime is 26-dimensional in bosonic string theory, 10-dimensional in superstring theory, and 11-dimensional in supergravity theory and M-theory.

References

Dimension
Physical cosmology
String theory
Physics beyond the Standard Model